Swashbuckler films are a subgenre of the action film genre, often characterised by swordfighting and adventurous heroic characters, known as swashbucklers. Real historical events often feature prominently in the plot, morality is often clear-cut, heroic characters are clearly heroic, and even villains tend to have a code of honour.  Often, they have a damsel in distress and a romantic element.

History
Right from the advent of cinema, the silent era was packed with swashbucklers. The most famous of those were the films of Douglas Fairbanks, such as The Mark of Zorro (1920), which defined the genre. The stories came from romantic costume novels, particularly those of Alexandre Dumas and Rafael Sabatini. Triumphant, thrilling music was also an important part of the formula. The three great cycles of swashbuckler films were the Douglas Fairbanks period from 1920 to 1929; the Errol Flynn period from 1935 to 1941; and a period in the 1950s heralded by films such as Ivanhoe (1952) and The Master of Ballantrae (1953), and the popularity of the British television series The Adventures of Robin Hood (1955–1959). Richard Lester's Dumas adaptations revived the genre in the 1970s.

Swashbucklers 

The term "swashbuckler" originates from boisterous fighters who carried a sword and buckler (a buckler being a small shield).  "Swashbuckler" was a putdown, used to indicate a poor swordsman who covered his lack of skill with noise, bragging, and clamour.  Novels, and then Hollywood, altered the word's connotation to make swashbuckler mean a loudmouthed but good braggart, and the hero of the plotline.

Jeffrey Richards describes the genre as very stylized. The hero is one who "maintains a decent standard of behavior, fights for King and Country, believes in truth and justice, defends the honour of lady". The values are those of a knight, so the setting is generally the 11th to 19th century.

Fencing 

Fencing was always a mainstay of this genre, and a dramatic duel was often a pivotal part of the storyline. Nowhere else is swordplay more apparent than in the swashbuckler film. Famous fencing instructors included Henry Uyttenhove, Fred Cavens, Jean Heremans, Ralph Faulkner, and Bob Anderson. They all had additional long careers in sport fencing.

Musical scores
Erich Wolfgang Korngold won the 1938 Academy Award for his score to The Adventures of Robin Hood. The 1935 Captain Blood was nominated for Music (Scoring); in 1940 The Sea Hawk was nominated for best Original Score.  Korngold was known for his late Romantic compositional style and assigning each character his or her own leitmotif. 
Alfred Newman wrote the scores for: The Prisoner of Zenda (1937), the 1940 version of The Mark of Zorro, and the 1942 The Black Swan (nominated for Best Original Score). The 1940 film of The Mark of Zorro was nominated for an Academy Award for the Best Original Score.
 Dimitri Tiomkin scored Cyrano de Bergerac (1950). According to film historian David Wallace, "His trademarks, huge, noisy cues, propulsive adventure themes that seemingly employed every brass instrument ever invented, and melting, emotionally wrought melodies accompanying romantic scenes also became the stock-in trade of just about every film composer since."
Hans Zimmer scored the Pirates of the Caribbean series, reinventing the swashbuckler musical style.

Television 
Television followed the films, and the British television series The Adventures of Robin Hood had produced 143 episodes by 1959 and became an outstanding success both in the United Kingdom and the United States.

British television production in the genre was prolific, and includes The Buccaneers (1956–1957), The Adventures of Sir Lancelot (1956–1957), Sword of Freedom (1958), The Adventures of William Tell (1958), The Adventures of the Scarlet Pimpernel (ITV, 1956), ITC's The Count of Monte Cristo (ITV, 1956), and George King's The Gay Cavalier (ITV, 1957), Quentin Durward (Studio Canal, 1971), Robin of Sherwood (ITV, 1984–1986), and Sharpe (ITV, since 1993).

American television produced two series of Zorro (1957 and 1990). Following the film The Mask of Zorro (1998), a television series about a female swashbuckler, the Queen of Swords, aired in 2000.

The Spanish television series Águila Roja (Red Eagle), aired from 2009 to 2016, is an example of the swashbuckler genre.

Italian and German televisions produced several series of Sandokan.

Notable films 

 The Mark of Zorro (1920)
 The Three Musketeers (1921)
 Robin Hood (1922)
 Don Q, Son of Zorro (1925)
 The Black Pirate (1926)
 The Iron Mask (1929)
 The Count of Monte Cristo (1934)
 The Scarlet Pimpernel (1934)
 Captain Blood (1935)
 The Bold Caballero (1936)
 The Prisoner of Zenda (1937)
 The Adventures of Robin Hood  (1938)
 The Man in the Iron Mask (1939)
 The Mark of Zorro (1940)
 The Sea Hawk (1940)
 The Son of Monte Cristo (1940)
 Sandokan films (1941-1970)
 The Black Swan (1942)
 Captain Kidd (1945)
 The Exile (1947)
 The Pirate (1948)
 The Three Musketeers (1948)
 Adventures of Don Juan (1948)
 The Elusive Pimpernel (1950)
 Cyrano de Bergerac (1950)
 Patala Bhairavi, a Telugu film (1951)
 The Prince Who Was a Thief (1951)
 Anne of the Indies (1951)
 Against All Flags (1952)
 Scaramouche (1952)
 Ivanhoe (1952)
 The Crimson Pirate (1952)
 The Golden Blade (1952)
 At Sword's Point (1952)
 The Master of Ballantrae (1953)
 Malaikkallan (1954)
 Nadodi Mannan (1958)
 The Moonraker (1958)
 The Vikings (1958)
 Mannadhi Mannan (1960)
 Cartouche (1962)
 Aayirathil Oruvan (1965)
 Haiducii (1966)
 The Testament of Aga Koppanyi (1967)
 Malkoçoğlu Cem Sultan (1969)
 The Devil's Servants (1970)
 Neerum Neruppum (1971)
 Battal Gazi Destanı (1971)
 The Three Musketeers (1973)
 The Four Musketeers (1974)
 Swashbuckler (1976)
 Robin and Marian (1976)
 Star Wars (1977)
 Madhuraiyai Meetta Sundharapandiyan (1978)
 The Scarlet Pimpernel (1982)
 Krull (1983)
 Pirates (1986)
 The Princess Bride (1987)
 Kondaveeti Donga, a Telugu film (1990)
 Robin Hood: Prince of Thieves (1991)
 The Three Musketeers (1993)
 Cutthroat Island (1995)
 Le Bossu (1997)
 The Mask of Zorro (1998)
 The Man in the Iron Mask (1998)
 The Musketeer (2001)
 The Lord of the Rings: The Fellowship of the Ring (2001)
 The Count of Monte Cristo (2002)
 Fanfan la Tulipe (2003)
 Pirates of the Caribbean: The Curse of the Black Pearl (2003)
 Master and Commander: The Far Side of the World (2003)
 Casanova (2005)
 The Legend of Zorro (2005)
 Alatriste (2006)
 Pirates of the Caribbean: Dead Man's Chest (2006)
 Pirates of the Caribbean: At World's End (2007)
 Stardust (2007)
 1612 (2007)
 Prince of Persia: The Sands of Time (2010)
 Pirates of the Caribbean: On Stranger Tides (2011)
 The Three Musketeers (2011)
 Badrinath (2011)
 Baahubali: The Beginning (2015)
 Puli (2015)
 Baahubali 2: The Conclusion (2017)
 Pirates of the Caribbean: Dead Men Tell No Tales (2017)

Notable actors and actresses 

 M. G. Ramachandran
 Johnny Depp
 Antonio Banderas
 Jean-Paul Belmondo
 Lex Barker
 Gérard Barray
 Kabir Bedi
 Dharmendra
 Orlando Bloom
 Jim Caviezel
 Ronald Colman
 Penélope Cruz
 Tony Curtis
 Olivia de Havilland
 Amitabh Bachhan
 John Derek
 Cary Elwes
 Douglas Fairbanks
 Douglas Fairbanks Jr.
 Mel Ferrer
 Errol Flynn
 Stewart Granger
 Richard Greene
 Louis Hayward
 Keira Knightley
 Frank Latimore
 Burt Lancaster
 Jean Marais
 Georges Marchal
 Kerwin Mathews
 Ian McShane
 Viggo Mortensen
 M. N. Nambiar (Gurusami)
 Maureen O'Hara
 Guy Pearce
 Vincent Perez
 Tyrone Power
 Edmund Purdom
 Rajkumar
 Kanta Rao
 Akkineni Nageswara Rao
 Sean Bean
 N. T. Rama Rao
 Basil Rathbone
 Steve Reeves
 Duncan Regehr
 Tim Roth
 Geoffrey Rush
 Tessie Santiago
 Robert Shaw
 Robert Taylor
 Richard Todd
 Raquel Welch
 Cornel Wilde
 Guy Williams
 Michael York
 Catherine Zeta-Jones

See also

 List of adventure films
 List of action films
 List of genres
 Combat in film
 Samurai film

References

External links 

 Errol Flynn: Holywood's Greatest Swashbuckler
 Swashbuckling TV at Screen Online
 Maureen O'Hara - Cinema Swashbucklers

French swashbuckler films
 
Film genres
Theatrical combat